WTBL-LD is a low power television station in Pascagoula, Mississippi, broadcasting locally on channel 31, owned by Gray Television alongside dual ABC/CBS affiliate WLOX (channel 13).

History
The original construction permit for the station was granted on October 29, 1987 for operation on channel 46; the station was assigned the call letters W46AV. Originally owned by Tel-Radio Communications Properties, the permit was transferred to the Trinity Broadcasting Network (TBN) in 1988. A license to cover was issued August 16, 1990. It moved to channel 51 in 2000 and became W51CU.

TBN sold W51CU to Tim Wall, owner of Scranton Broadcasting Company, LLC in 2010. Soon after the sale was approved (but while still under TBN ownership), the station changed its call letters to WGUD-LP.  Scranton relaunched WGUD-LP on September 1, 2010 as a FamilyNet affiliate, with some local programming. On January 4, 2013, the station changed its call sign to WGUD-LD.

On October 3, 2022, the station changed its callsign from WGUD-LD to WTBL-LD

Digital television
The station's digital signal is multiplexed:

WTBL-LD currently has a construction permit to move its signal to digital channel 38. A previous such permit, granted in 2006, expired on June 19, 2009. Around 2011, WGUD-LP consummated its relocation, and began broadcasting three subchannels, with programming from FamilyNet, MeTV and Pursuit Channel. The Cowboy Channel replaced FamilyNet on July 1, 2017.

References

External links
WLOX website

TBL-LD
Low-power television stations in the United States
MeTV affiliates
Television channels and stations established in 1990
Pascagoula, Mississippi
1990 establishments in Mississippi